Heinrich Feldman, also known as Harold Feldman or Chaim Moshe Feldman, (born November 1935; died March 22, 2022) was a British property investor. In 2015, he had wealth of £100–360 million.

Companies founded and owned

Inremco 26 
Inremco 26 is among the London-based property redevelopment and holding companies Feldman founded in 1983. In its financial year 2012–13, it had assets of £107,000,00000. The company bought 1 Poultry, in the City of London, for two million less than this sum in December 2010. The company sold the large block for a gross gain of £500 million to the private equity firm Perella Weinberg Partners in 2014.

Wade Properties 
Wade Properties is Feldman's company having the same purposes based in Israel.

Family trustee 
Feldman was the main donor and indirect trustee of the Mazal Brocha Trust, belonging to his descendants, managed by Bank Leumi Overseas Trust Corporation, a Jersey company. In 2013, he directed the corporation sue its lawyers as to the mechanism used for certain Israeli property investments.

References

1935 births
Living people
Businesspeople from London